Shunduk may refer to:
Shunduk River, a river in the Republic of Adygea, Russia
Shunduk (village), a village (khutor) in the Republic of Adygea, Russia